Revolting is a British sketch/prank TV show starring Heydon Prowse and Jolyon Rubinstein, which aired for five episodes in 2017 on BBC Two. It is a follow-up to The Revolution Will Be Televised, a similar comedy show starring the two, which aired on BBC Three from 2012 to 2015. Revolting includes characters from the previous show like the fictional Tory MP James Twottington-Burbage, as well as new characters like Duckface, a self-important online activist.

One sketch on the show which notably caused controversy was "The Real Housewives of ISIS", a parody of The Real Housewives reality television franchise, set among the wives of terrorists from the Islamic State of Iraq and Syria.

References

External links
 

2010s British satirical television series
2017 British television series debuts
2017 British television series endings
BBC television comedy
English-language television shows
Television series by Hat Trick Productions